Léon-Provancher Ecological Reserve is an ecological reserve in Quebec, Canada. It was established in 1999.

External links
 Official website from Government of Québec

Protected areas of Centre-du-Québec
Nature reserves in Quebec
Protected areas established in 1999
1999 establishments in Quebec